Curcuma bicolor is a species of flowering plant in the ginger family. It was first described by John Donald Mood and Kai Larsen.

Range
Curcuma bicolor is native to Thailand.

References 

bicolor